Arnaud Dos Santos (born 19 September 1945) is a French former footballer and coach.

He played for US Boulogne, FC Rouen, AS Monaco FC, FC Girondins de Bordeaux, Troyes AC and Lille OSC.

After his playing career, he became a coach with Ligue 1 and Ligue 2 clubs, such as Lille OSC and RC Lens.

References

External links
SiterCLProfile
MonacoProfile
Sofoot Profile

1945 births
Living people
French footballers
French people of Portuguese descent
US Boulogne players
FC Rouen players
AS Monaco FC players
FC Girondins de Bordeaux players
ES Troyes AC players
Lille OSC players
Ligue 1 players
Ligue 2 players
French football managers
Lille OSC managers
AS Beauvais Oise managers
FC Rouen managers
RC Lens managers
FC Istres managers
Amiens SC managers
Association football midfielders